Phosphorylase b kinase gamma catalytic chain, testis/liver isoform is an enzyme that in humans is encoded by the PHKG2 gene.

The PHKG2 gene provides instructions for making one piece, the gamma subunit, of the phosphorylase b kinase enzyme. This enzyme is made up of 16 subunits, four each of the alpha, beta, gamma, and delta subunits. (Each subunit is produced from a different gene.) The gamma subunit performs the function of phosphorylase b kinase enzyme, and the other subunits help regulate its activity. This enzyme is found in various tissues, although it is most abundant in the liver and muscles. One version of the enzyme is found in liver cells and another in muscle cells. The gamma-2 subunit produced from the PHKG2 gene is part of the enzyme found in the liver.

Phosphorylase b kinase plays an important role in providing energy for cells. The main source of cellular energy is a simple sugar called glucose. Glucose is stored in muscle and liver cells in a form called glycogen. Glycogen can be broken down rapidly when glucose is needed, for instance to maintain normal levels of glucose in the blood between meals. Phosphorylase b kinase turns on (activates) another enzyme called glycogen phosphorylase b by converting it to the more active form, glycogen phosphorylase a. When active, this enzyme breaks down glycogen.

References

Further reading

External links
  GeneReviews/NCBI/NIH/UW entry on Phosphorylase Kinase Deficiency, Glycogen Storage Disease Type IX

EC 2.7.11